Chertovy Vorota Cave (known as Devil's Gate Cave in English) is a Neolithic archaeological site located in the Sikhote-Alin mountains, about  from the town of Dalnegorsk in Primorsky Krai, Russia. Chertovy Vorota provides secure evidence for some of the oldest surviving textiles found in the archaeological record.

Description
The site was looted several times before the first archaeological excavations were performed in 1973. Around 600 lithic, osteological and shell artefacts, 700 pottery fragments, and over 700 animal bones were recovered from the site.

The remains of racoon dog, brown bear, Asian black bear, wild boar, badger, red deer, fish and mollusc shells were found inside the cave.

Diet
Isotopic analysis shows that the people of Chertovy Vorota likely derived their protein from a mix of terrestrial and maritime sources; around 25% of their dietary protein appears to have been derived from maritime resources, most likely from anadromous salmon. The people of Chertovy Vorota likely hunted terrestrial mammals, collected nuts and fished salmon to provide for their food needs.

Ancient textiles
The remains of carbonized textile fragments were found within the cave, under the remains of a wooden structure that had caught on fire and collapsed. The carbonized remains of rope, nets, and woven fabrics were recovered from the cave. The fibers likely came from Carex sordida, a sedge grass from the family Cyperaceae. The textile remains were directly dated to around 9400-8400 BP, the earliest evidence in the archaeological record for textile remains from East Asia. As spindle whorls were not found in the cave, and also rarely found in contemporary East Asian sites, archaeologists postulate that the people at Chertovy Vorota either produced their textiles by hand or through the use of warp-weighted looms.

Human remains
The remains of 7 individuals were discovered within the cave. The skulls of two of the individuals, DevilsGate1 and DevilsGate2, were directly dated to around 5726-5622 BC.

Archaeogenetics
Six of seven individuals whose remains have been recovered from the cave have been DNA tested. Originally, three of the specimens were thought to be adult males, two were thought to be adult females, one was thought to be a sub-adult of about 12-13 years of age, and one was thought to be a juvenile of about 6-7 years of age based on the skeletal morphology of the remains. Results of genetic analysis of the sub-adult individual have not yet been published. However, two specimens, NEO236 (Skull B, DevilsGate2) and NEO235 (Skull G), who had been presumed to be adult males according to a forensic morphological assessment of their remains, were discovered through genetic analysis to actually be females. The juvenile specimen also has been determined to be female through genetic analysis. Three of the specimens (including the only adult male plus NEO235/Skull G and another adult female, labeled as Skull Е, DevilsGate1, or NEO240, who has been genetically determined to be a first-degree relative of NEO235/Skull G) have been assigned to mtDNA haplogroup D4m; a previous genetic analysis of one of these adult female specimens determined her mtDNA haplogroup to be D4. Another three specimens (including the juvenile female, the DevilsGate2 specimen, and another adult female; both the juvenile female and the DevilsGate2 specimen have been determined to be first-degree relatives of the other adult female, and the juvenile female and the DevilsGate2 specimen also have been determined to be second-degree relatives of each other) have been assigned to haplogroup D4; a previous genetic analysis of the DevilsGate2 specimen determined her mtDNA haplogroup to be M. The only specimen from the cave who has been confirmed to be male through genetic analysis has been assigned to Y-DNA haplogroup C2b-F6273/Y6704/Y6708, equivalent to C2b-L1373, the northern (Central Asian, Siberian, and indigenous American) branch of haplogroup C2-M217.

When compared against all populations on record, ancient or modern, the ancient Chertovy Vorota individuals were found to be genetically closest to the contemporary Ulchi, speakers of a Tungusic language from the lower Amur Basin. The DevilsGate1 and DevilsGate2 specimens were also found to be close to the Hezhen and Oroqen, two other contemporary Tungusic-speaking populations from the basin of the Amur River, as well as contemporary Koreans, and Nganasans. When compared against an outgroup from southern Africa (Khomani), outgroup f3 statistics indicate that DevilsGate1 and DevilsGate2 exhibit greatest shared drift with representatives of the same six populations, though in slightly different rank order: DevilsGate1 shares greatest drift with Ulchi followed in order by Oroqen, Hezhen, Korean, and Nganasan, whereas DevilsGate2 shares greatest drift with Ulchi followed in order by Nganasan, Hezhen, Korean, Japanese, and Oroqen (cf. Fig. 2). The outgroup f3 statistics also reveal a tendency for the DevilsGate2 specimen to exhibit slightly greater shared drift with contemporary populations than the DevilsGate1 specimen shares with contemporary populations. The ancient Chertovy Vorota individuals are genetically closest to the Ulchi, followed by the Oroqen and Hezhen. The genetic distance from the ancient Chertovy Vorota individuals to Mal'ta boy is the same as that from modern East Asian populations to Mal'ta boy.

With the exception of DevilsGate1, most of the individuals tested did not yield enough DNA to allow for phenotypic testing of traits. DevilsGate1 did not carry the derived SLC45A2 or SLC24A5 alleles associated with lighter skin color, the derived HERC2 allele associated with blue eyes, the derived LT allele associated with lactase persistence, or the derived ALDH2 allele associated with the alcohol flush reaction. However, the individual likely did carry the derived EDAR allele commonly found in modern East Asian populations, the derived ABCC11 allele associated with dry earwax and reduced body odor commonly found in modern East Asian populations, and the derived ADD1 allele associated with increased risk for hypertension.

References

Citations

Bibliography

 
 
 
 
 
 

Archaeological sites in Siberia
Caves of Russia
Landforms of Primorsky Krai
Prehistoric sites in Russia
Objects of cultural heritage of Russia of federal significance
Cultural heritage monuments in Primorsky Krai